Caroline Ruhnau (born 16 October 1984) is a German swimmer. She competed at the 2012 Summer Olympics in the 100 m breaststroke, but failed to reach the final. She won this event at the European Short Course Swimming Championships 2009. She also won two bronze medals at European long-course championships in 2010 and 2012.

Her younger sister Alice is also a breaststroke swimmer. She swam on the next lane to Caroline at the Olympic trials in 2012.

References

External links
 
  
  
 
 

German female swimmers
Swimmers at the 2012 Summer Olympics
Olympic swimmers of Germany
1984 births
Living people
Place of birth missing (living people)
European Aquatics Championships medalists in swimming
German female breaststroke swimmers
Sportspeople from Münster
20th-century German women
21st-century German women